Surfing In The Air  is the debut album by Norwegian pop singer Christine Guldbrandsen, released in 2003 in Norway and Finland through Sony Music Entertainment, Surfing In The Air became a huge success in Norway, selling 30,000 album copies in only 3 weeks and received a Gold Record.

Album information
Surfing In The Air contains 11 tracks, sung in Latin and English. The opening track Surfing In The Air contains lyrics from the song Walking in the Air written by Howard Blake in 1982.

Reception

A review in the website Musical Discoveries states, "The eleven light pop-oriented tracks illustrate the crystalline soprano texture of her voice. Solid rock instrumental arrangements never overwhelm the vocal layers."

Track listing

References 

2003 debut albums
Christine Guldbrandsen albums